In physics, the cross section is a measure of the probability that a specific process will take place when some kind of radiant excitation (e.g. a particle beam, sound wave, light, or an X-ray) intersects a localized phenomenon (e.g. a particle or density fluctuation). For example, the Rutherford cross-section is a measure of probability that an alpha particle will be deflected by a given angle during an interaction with an atomic nucleus. Cross section is typically denoted  (sigma) and is expressed in units of area, more specifically in barns. In a way, it can be thought of as the size of the object that the excitation must hit in order for the process to occur, but more exactly, it is a parameter of a stochastic process.

In classical physics, this probability often converges to a deterministic proportion of excitation energy involved in the process, so that, for example, with light scattering off of a particle, the cross section specifies the amount of optical power scattered from light of a given irradiance (power per area). It is important to note that although the cross section has the same units as area, the cross section may not necessarily correspond to the actual physical size of the target given by other forms of measurement. It is not uncommon for the actual cross-sectional area of a scattering object to be much larger or smaller than the cross section relative to some physical process. For example, plasmonic nanoparticles can have light scattering cross sections for particular frequencies that are much larger than their actual cross-sectional areas.

When two discrete particles interact in classical physics, their mutual cross section is the area transverse to their relative motion within which they must meet in order to scatter from each other. If the particles are hard inelastic spheres that interact only upon contact, their scattering cross section is related to their geometric size. If the particles interact through some action-at-a-distance force, such as electromagnetism or gravity, their scattering cross section is generally larger than their geometric size.

When a cross section is specified as the differential limit of a function of some final-state variable, such as particle angle or energy, it is called a differential cross section (see detailed discussion below). When a cross section is integrated over all scattering angles (and possibly other variables), it is called a total cross section or integrated total cross section. For example, in Rayleigh scattering, the intensity scattered at the forward and backward angles is greater than the intensity scattered sideways, so the forward differential scattering cross section is greater than the perpendicular differential cross section, and by adding all of the infinitesimal cross sections over the whole range of angles with integral calculus, we can find the total cross section.

Scattering cross sections may be defined in nuclear, atomic, and particle physics for collisions of accelerated beams of one type of particle with targets (either stationary or moving) of a second type of particle. The probability for any given reaction to occur is in proportion to its cross section. Thus, specifying the cross section for a given reaction is a proxy for stating the probability that a given scattering process will occur.

The measured reaction rate of a given process depends strongly on experimental variables such as the density of the target material, the intensity of the beam, the detection efficiency of the apparatus, or the angle setting of the detection apparatus. However, these quantities can be factored away, allowing measurement of the underlying two-particle collisional cross section.

Differential and total scattering cross sections are among the most important measurable quantities in nuclear, atomic, and particle physics.

Collision among gas particles

In a gas of finite-sized particles there are collisions among particles that depend on their cross-sectional size. The average distance that a particle travels between collisions depends on the density of gas particles. These quantities are related by

where
 is the cross section of a two-particle collision (SI units: m2),
 is the mean free path between collisions (SI units: m),
 is the number density of the target particles (SI units: m−3).

If the particles in the gas can be treated as hard spheres of radius  that interact by direct contact, as illustrated in Figure 1, then the effective cross section for the collision of a pair is

If the particles in the gas interact by a force with a larger range than their physical size, then the cross section is a larger effective area that may depend on a variety of variables such as the energy of the particles.

Cross sections can be computed for atomic collisions but also are used in the subatomic realm. For example, in nuclear physics a "gas" of low-energy neutrons collides with nuclei in a reactor or other nuclear device, with a cross section that is energy-dependent and hence also with well-defined mean free path between collisions.

Attenuation of a beam of particles

If a beam of particles enters a thin layer of material of thickness , the flux  of the beam will decrease by  according to

where  is the total cross section of all events, including scattering, absorption, or transformation to another species. Solving this equation exhibits the exponential attenuation of the beam intensity:

For light, this is called the Beer–Lambert law.

Differential cross section

Consider a classical measurement where a single particle is scattered off a single stationary target particle. Conventionally, a spherical coordinate system is used, with the target placed at the origin and the  axis of this coordinate system aligned with the incident beam.

The impact parameter  is the perpendicular offset of the trajectory of the incoming particle, and the outgoing particle emerges at an angle . For a given interaction (Coulombic, magnetic, gravitational, contact, etc.), the impact parameter and the scattering angle have a definite one-to-one functional dependence on each other. Generally the impact parameter can neither be controlled nor measured from event to event and is assumed to take all possible values when averaging over many scattering events. The differential size of the cross section is the area element in the plane of the impact parameter, i.e. . The differential angular range of the scattered particle at angle  is the solid angle element . The differential cross section is the quotient of these quantities, .

It is a function of the scattering angle (and therefore also the impact parameter), plus other observables such as the momentum of the incoming particle. The differential cross section is always taken to be positive, even though larger impact parameters generally produce less deflection. In cylindrically symmetric situations (about the beam axis), the azimuthal angle  is not changed by the scattering process, and the differential cross section can be written as
.

In situations where the scattering process is not azimuthally symmetric, such as when the beam or target particles possess magnetic moments oriented perpendicular to the beam axis, the differential cross section must also be expressed as a function of the azimuthal angle.

This formula assumes that the target is thin enough that each beam particle will interact with at most one target particle.

The total cross section  may be recovered by integrating the differential cross section  over the full solid angle ( steradians):

It is common to omit the “differential” qualifier when the type of cross section can be inferred from context. In this case,  may be referred to as the integral cross section or total cross section. The latter term may be confusing in contexts where multiple events are involved, since “total” can also refer to the sum of cross sections over all events.

The differential cross section is extremely useful quantity in many fields of physics, as measuring it can reveal a great amount of information about the internal structure of the target particles. For example, the differential cross section of Rutherford scattering provided strong evidence for the existence of the atomic nucleus.

Instead of the solid angle, the momentum transfer may be used as the independent variable of differential cross sections.

Differential cross sections in inelastic scattering contain resonance peaks that indicate the creation of metastable states and contain information about their energy and lifetime.

Quantum scattering
In the time-independent formalism of quantum scattering, the initial wave function (before scattering) is taken to be a plane wave with definite momentum :

The arrow indicates that this only describes the asymptotic behavior of the wave function when the projectile and target are too far apart for the interaction to have any effect.

After scattering takes place it is expected that the wave function takes on the following asymptotic form:

where  is some function of the angular coordinates known as the scattering amplitude. This general form is valid for any short-ranged, energy-conserving interaction. It is not true for long-ranged interactions, so there are additional complications when dealing with electromagnetic interactions.

The full wave function of the system behaves asymptotically as the sum

The differential cross section is related to the scattering amplitude:

This has the simple interpretation as the probability density for finding the scattered projectile at a given angle.

A cross section is therefore a measure of the effective surface area seen by the impinging particles, and as such is expressed in units of area. The cross section of two particles (i.e. observed when the two particles are colliding with each other) is a measure of the interaction event between the two particles. The cross section is proportional to the probability that an interaction will occur; for example in a simple scattering experiment the number of particles scattered per unit of time (current of scattered particles ) depends only on the number of incident particles per unit of time (current of incident particles ), the characteristics of target (for example the number of particles per unit of surface ), and the type of interaction. For  we have

Relation to the S-matrix

where the on-shell  matrix is defined by

in terms of the S-matrix. Here  is the Dirac delta function. The computation of the S-matrix is the main goal of the scattering theory.

Units
Although the SI unit of total cross sections is m2, smaller units are usually used in practice.

In nuclear and particle physics, the conventional unit is the barn b, where 1 b = 10−28 m2 = 100 fm2. Smaller prefixed units such as mb and μb are also widely used. Correspondingly, the differential cross section can be measured in units such as mb/sr.

When the scattered radiation is visible light, it is conventional to measure the path length in centimetres. To avoid the need for conversion factors, the scattering cross section is expressed in cm2, and the number concentration in cm−3. The measurement of the scattering of visible light is known as nephelometry, and is effective for particles of 2–50 µm in diameter: as such, it is widely used in meteorology and in the measurement of atmospheric pollution.

The scattering of X-rays can also be described in terms of scattering cross sections, in which case the square ångström is a convenient unit: 1 Å2 = 10−20 m2 =  = 108 b. The sum of the scattering, photoelectric, and pair-production cross-sections (in barns) is charted as the "atomic attenuation coefficient" (narrow-beam), in barns.

Scattering of light

For light, as in other settings, the scattering cross section for particles is generally different from the geometrical cross section of the particle, and it depends upon the wavelength of light and the permittivity, shape, and size of the particle. The total amount of scattering in a sparse medium is proportional to the product of the scattering cross section and the number of particles present.

In the interaction of light with particles, many processes occur, each with their own cross sections, including absorption, scattering, and photoluminescence. The sum of the absorption and scattering cross sections is sometimes referred to as the attenuation or extinction cross section.

The total extinction cross section is related to the attenuation of the light intensity through the Beer–Lambert law, which says that attenuation is proportional to particle concentration:

The absorbance of the radiation is the logarithm (decadic or, more usually, natural) of the reciprocal of the transmittance :

Combining the scattering and absorption cross sections in this manner is often necessitated by the inability to distinguish them experimentally, and much research effort has been put into developing models that allow them to be distinguished, the Kubelka-Munk theory being one of the most important in this area.

Cross section and Mie theory

Cross sections commonly calculated using Mie theory include efficiency coefficients for extinction , scattering , and Absorption  cross sections. Those are normalized by the geometrical cross sections of the particle  as 
The cross section is defined by 
 
For a plane wave the intensity is going to be , where  is the impedance of the host medium.

The main approach is based on the following. Firstly, we construct an imaginary sphere of radius  (surface ) around the particle (the scatterer). The net rate of electromagnetic energy crosses the surface  is
 
where  is the time averaged Poynting vector. If  energy is absorbed within the sphere, otherwise energy is being created within the sphere. We exclude from consideration the later one. Once host medium is non-absorbing, the energy is absorbed by the particle. We decompose the total field into incident and scattered parts , and the same for the magnetic field . Thus, we can decompose  into the three terms , where
 

All the field can be decomposed into the series of vector spherical harmonics (VSH). After that, all the integrals can be taken.
In the case of a uniform sphere of radius , permittivity , and permeability  the problem has a precise solution.  The scattering and extinction coefficients are   Where . Those are connected as

Dipole approximation for the scattering cross section 

 

Scattering of light on extended bodies

In the context of scattering light on extended bodies, the scattering cross section, describes the likelihood of light being scattered by a macroscopic particle. In general, the scattering cross section is different from the geometrical cross section of a particle, as it depends upon the wavelength of light and the permittivity in addition to the shape and size of the particle. The total amount of scattering in a sparse medium is determined by the product of the scattering cross section and the number of particles present. In terms of area, the total cross section is the sum of the cross sections due to absorption, scattering, and luminescence:

The extinction or absorbance of the radiation is the logarithm (decadic or, more usually, natural) of the reciprocal of the transmittance :

Relation to physical size
There is no simple relationship between the scattering cross section and the physical size of the particles, as the scattering cross section depends on the wavelength of radiation used. This can be seen when looking at a halo surrounding the moon on a decently foggy evening: Red light photons experience a larger cross sectional area of water droplets than photons of higher energy do.  The halo around the moon thus has a perimeter of red light due to lower energy photons being scattering further from the center of the moon. Photons from the rest of the visible spectrum are left within the center of the halo and perceived as white light.

Meteorological range
The scattering cross section is related to the meteorological range :

The quantity  is sometimes denoted , the scattering coefficient per unit length.

Examples

Example 1: elastic collision of two hard spheres
The total cross section is

So in this case the total scattering cross section is equal to the area of the circle (with radius ) within which the center of mass of the incoming sphere has to arrive for it to be deflected, and outside which it passes by the stationary scattering center. When the radius of the incoming sphere is approaching zero, the cross section is just the area of a circle with radius R.

Example 2: scattering light from a 2D circular mirror

Another example illustrates the details of the calculation of a simple light scattering model obtained by a reduction of the dimension. For simplicity, we will consider the scattering of a beam of light on a plane treated as a uniform density of parallel rays and within the framework of geometrical optics from a circle with radius  with a perfectly reflecting boundary. Its three-dimensional equivalent is therefore the more difficult problem of a laser or flashlight light scattering from the mirror sphere, for example, from the mechanical bearing ball. The unit of cross section in one dimension is the unit of length, for example 1 m. Let  be the angle between the light ray and the radius joining the reflection point of the light ray with the center point of the circle mirror. Then the increase of the length element perpendicular to the light beam is expressed by this angle as

the reflection angle of this ray with respect to the incoming ray is then , and the scattering angle is

The energy or the number of photons reflected from the light beam with the intensity or density of photons  on the length  is

The differential cross section is therefore

As it is seen from the behaviour of the sine function, this quantity has the maximum for the backward scattering (the light is reflected perpendicularly and returns), and the zero minimum for the scattering from the edge of the circle directly forward. It confirms the intuitive expectations that the mirror circle acts like a diverging lens, and a thin beam is more diluted the closer it is from the edge defined with respect to the incoming direction. The total cross section can be obtained by summing (integrating) the differential section of the entire range of angles:

so it is equal as much as the circular mirror is totally screening the two-dimensional space for the beam of light. In three dimensions for the mirror ball with the radius  it is therefore equal .

Example 3: scattering light from a 3D spherical mirror
We can now use the result from the Example 2 to calculate the differential cross section for the light scattering from the perfectly reflecting sphere in three dimensions. In any plane of the incoming and the reflected ray we can write now from the previous example:

while the impact area element is

Using the relation for the solid angle in the spherical coordinates:

and the trigonometric identity

we obtain

while the total cross section as we expected is

As one can see, it also agrees with the result from the Example 1 if the photon is assumed to be a rigid sphere of zero radius.

See also

Cross section (geometry)
Flow velocity
Luminosity (scattering theory)
Linear attenuation coefficient
Mass attenuation coefficient
Neutron cross section
Nuclear cross section
Gamma ray cross section
Partial wave analysis
Particle detector
Radar cross-section
Rutherford scattering
Scattering amplitude

References

General references

J. D. Bjorken, S. D. Drell, Relativistic Quantum Mechanics, 1964
P. Roman, Introduction to Quantum Theory, 1969
W. Greiner, J. Reinhardt, Quantum Electrodynamics, 1994
R. G. Newton. Scattering Theory of Waves and Particles. McGraw Hill, 1966.

External links
Nuclear Cross Section
Scattering Cross Section
IAEA - Nuclear Data Services
BNL - National Nuclear Data Center
Particle Data Group - The Review of Particle Physics
IUPAC Goldbook - Definition: Reaction Cross Section
IUPAC Goldbook - Definition: Collision Cross Section
ShimPlotWell cross section plotter for nuclear data

Atomic physics
Physical quantities
Dimensional analysis
Experimental particle physics
Measurement
Nuclear physics
Particle physics
Scattering theory
Scattering, absorption and radiative transfer (optics)
Scattering
Spectroscopy